The Boss is a wooden roller coaster located in the Britannia section of Six Flags St. Louis in Eureka, Missouri. It opened on April 29, 2000, and was manufactured by Custom Coasters International.

History
In September 1999, Six Flags St. Louis announced that they would be adding a new wooden roller coaster for the 2000 season. Built by Custom Coasters International, it would be located towards the back of the park in the Britannia section. The park presented the city of Eureka with the new coaster blueprints.

On February 3, 2000, the park revealed more details about their upcoming attraction. The new ride would be named The Boss and be a large terrain wooden roller coaster, very similar to The Beast at Kings Island. It would cover  of land on the northwest edge of the property, crossing over itself six times and ending with a 560-degree helix.

The Boss was originally set to open on April 21, 2000, but the coaster's opening was delayed to April 29. It has been acclaimed for its "terrain twister" style, dipping up and down with the terrain beneath it.

In 2009, the coaster got spare Gerstlauer trains from Twisted Twins at Kentucky Kingdom after  the coasters wing of the park was closed. It had previously received other spare trains from Mega Zeph at Six Flags New Orleans.

The coaster used to be 5,021 feet of track.

Ride experience
Out of the station, the track passes through the transfer track, and makes a slight left turn before making a right hand turn to climb the  lift hill. At the top of the lift hill, the track makes a left turn and dives down a  drop into a ravine, leveling out as it zooms through the structure of the third hill and rises into an elevated turnaround. It then  dives down a  drop back into the ravine, and rises up a third hill. At the top of the hill, the track makes a level right hand turn into the midcourse brakes. Following this, the track makes a right turn, passes under the lift hill, and over a pair of smaller airtime hills with slight right turns, before making a 180 degree banked turnaround (570 degree double helix prior to 2018), leading into a bunny hop and the final brake run. This is concluded with a left hand turn to return to the station.

Characteristics
Formerly the eighth longest wooden coaster in the world prior to the 2018 removal of the helix.

Awards

References

External links
 

Wooden roller coasters
Roller coasters operated by Six Flags
Six Flags St. Louis
Roller coasters in Missouri
Roller coasters introduced in 2000